Lisove may refer to the following localities in Ukraine,

 Lisove, Kirovohrad Oblast, an urban-type settlement in Kirovohrad Oblast
 Lisove, Brody Raion, a village in Lviv Oblast